Frederico Pinheiro (born 17 April 1901, date of death unknown) was a Brazilian footballer. He played in two matches for the Brazil national football team in 1921. He was also part of Brazil's squad for the 1921 South American Championship.

References

External links
 

1901 births
Year of death missing
Brazilian footballers
Brazil international footballers
Place of birth missing
Association football forwards
Bangu Atlético Clube players
CR Flamengo footballers
Brazilian football managers
Bangu Atlético Clube managers